Le Splendid is a café-théâtre company founded by a collection of writers and actors in the 1970s - Christian Clavier, Michel Blanc, Gérard Jugnot, Thierry Lhermitte (four childhood friends who knew one another from the Lycée Pasteur in Neuilly-sur-Seine), Josiane Balasko, Marie-Anne Chazel, Bruno Moynot and Claire Magnin. The members of the company went on to become some of the most significant actors and directors in French cinema from the 1980s onwards and have collectively won many César awards.

Anémone, Dominique Lavanant and Martin Lamotte have often worked with the troupe on stage and in films, but are not part of the collective. The café-théâtre was located in the  rue des Lombards in the 4th arrondissement of Paris.

Members

Principal members
 Josiane Balasko
 Michel Blanc
 Marie-Anne Chazel
 Christian Clavier
 Gérard Jugnot
 Thierry Lhermitte

Collaborators
 Anémone
 Dominique Lavanant
 Bruno Moynot
 Martin Lamotte

Theatre 
Je Vais Craquer
Ma Tête est Malade 
Le Pot de Terre Contre le Pot de Vin 
Bunny's Bar ou Les Hommes Préfèrent Les Grosses
Amours, coquillages et crustacés (stage version of the film Les Bronzés) 
Le Père Noël est une ordure

Filmography 
 1978 : French Fried Vacation directed by Patrice Leconte 
 1979 : French Fried Vacation 2 directed by Patrice Leconte 
 1982 : Santa Claus Is a Stinker directed by Jean-Marie Poiré 
 1983 : Gramps Is in the Resistance directed by Jean-Marie Poiré 
 1994 : Dead Tired directed by Michel Blanc
 2006 : French Fried Vacation 3 directed by Patrice Leconte

Individually each member of Le Splendid has had a successful career, collectively comprising hundreds of films and plays.

Box-office 
Movies starring one or all members of the Splendid with more than a million of ticket sales.

 Christian Clavier play in 25 movies over a million of entries. The films in which he played has sold 122 167 881 ticket.
 Thierry Lhermitte play in 29 movies over a million of entries. The films in which he played has sold 109 850 038 ticket.
 Gérard Jugnot play in 33 movies over a million of entries. The films in which he played has sold 105 415 238 ticket.
 Josiane Balasko play in 26 movies over a million of entries. The films in which she played has sold 78 534 082 ticket.
 Michel Blanc play in 21 movies over a million of entries. The films in which he played has sold 69 400 706 ticket.
 Marie-Anne Chazel play in 16 movies over a million of entries. The films in which she played has sold 60 138 655 ticket.

Awards

Cannes Film Festival

César Award

Thierry Lhermitte and Marie-Anne Chazel have never been nominated for a César Award. Josiane Balasko is the most awarded with 2 César and Michel Blanc, the most nominated with 8 nomination.

European Film Awards

Golden Globe Awards

Lumières Award

References 

Theatres in Paris
Cinema of France